The Monumento a los héroes de El Polvorín (Monument to the "El Polvorín" fire heroes) is a monument at Plaza Las Delicias in Ponce, Puerto Rico, dedicated to the seven fire fighters and one civilian that subdued the flames of the "El Polvorin" fire on the night of 25 January 1899.

Location
The monument is located in a shady area on the eastern half of Plaza Degetau, the southern plaza at Plaza Las Delicias in Ponce, Puerto Rico, and it honors the following seven firemen and one civilian:

 Rafael Rivera Esbrí (civilian)
 Pedro Sabater (2nd Corporal)
 Rafael del Valle (1st Corporal)
 Cayetano Casals (2nd Corporal)
 Pedro Ruiz (1st Sargent)
 Juan Romero (1st Corporal)
 Gregorio Rivera (Gastador)
 Tomas Rivera (2nd Corporal)

Its coordinates are 18.011503°N 66.613846°W (18°00′41″N 66°36′50″W).

Background
On 25 January 1899, a large fire (later dubbed "El Polvorin") threatened the lives of the residents of the city of Ponce and, given Ponce's de facto role as Puerto Rico's banking and agricultural capital, it threaten the economy of Puerto Rico as a whole. The fire started at the horse barn of the recently deployed U.S. Army artillery encampment one block from the center of town, on Calle Salud between Calle Cristina and Calle Comercio, and quickly spread towards the army's artillery munitions storage area.  By the time the local commander realized there was a fire near the munitions compound, he judged it too risky for his men to try to put it out and ordered all personnel to move away from the area to let the fire extinguish itself, even if it meant explosions at the munitions depot. The commander also instructed the local firemen (then numbering about 40) not to enter the area or attempt to extinguish the fire. However, seven of the firemen and one civilian disobeyed the orders of the commander and decided to fight the fire. They were able to suppress the fire before it could get to the gunpowder reserves, without any loss of life or additional loss of property. Due to their efforts, disaster upon the then mostly wooden homes and businesses in town was averted. For their success, the group was honored many times both in Ponce and the rest of Puerto Rico. The obelisk was built to honor their memory.

The structure
The obelisk was built in 1948. It replaced the original obelisk built shortly after the 25 January 1899 fire, but which was destroyed by the 1918 San Fermín earthquake. The obelisk was erected by a city board consisting of Jaime L. Drew, Antonio Arias, and Antonio Mirabal. This monument is different from the obelisk/tomb built in 1911, and dedicated to the same men, and which stands at the Cementerio Civil de Ponce (Ponce Civil Cemetery).

The four-sided obelisk has four plaques, one on each side.

The plaque facing East reads:

The North-facing plaque lists the honored men, saying:

The Western-facing plaque says:

The plaque facing South reads:

Notes

References

Further reading

 Fay Fowlie de Flores. Ponce, Perla del Sur: Una Bibliográfica Anotada. Second Edition. 1997. Ponce, Puerto Rico: Universidad de Puerto Rico en Ponce. p. 259. Item 1299. 
 P. A. Reyes Vargas. "El Parque de Artillería de Ponce." El Imparcial. San Juan, Puerto Rico. 11 de septiembre de 1954. pp. S-8 to S-9. 

Monuments and memorials in Ponce, Puerto Rico
1948 establishments in Puerto Rico
Firefighting in Puerto Rico
Firefighting memorials